John Harold Force (born May 4, 1949 in Bell Gardens, California) is an American NHRA drag racer. He is a 16-time NHRA and 1 time AHRA Funny Car champion driver and a 22-time champion car owner. Force owns and drives for John Force Racing (JFR). He is one of the most dominant drag racers in the sport with 155 career victories.  He graduated from Bell Gardens High School and briefly attended Cerritos Junior College to play football.  He is the father of drag racers Ashley Force Hood, Brittany Force, and Courtney Force. His oldest daughter Adria Hight is the CFO of JFR.

Current drivers racing for his team are son-in-law Robert Hight, and daughter Brittany. Mike Neff was crew chief for John two separate times. Effective July 2013 Jimmy Prock replaced Mike Neff as crew chief, and Mike Neff became crew chief for Robert Hight. Neff, who was once the crew chief for rival driver Gary Scelzi, raced in a 4th Funny Car for JFR from October 26, 2007, following the death of Eric Medlen, until the end of the 2009 season. However, in 2010, after a 2009 season in which Force did not win a single race, Force parked his 4th car, and named Neff as his new crew chief instead. This decision resulted in Force winning his 15th NHRA Championship. His nickname among several of the drivers, as well as several announcers within the sport of drag racing is "Brute Force", a nickname he earned by his dominating wins during his run of ten straight NHRA championships. Force, his daughters, Courtney, Ashley, and Brittany, and son-in-law Robert Hight are collectively known as "The First Family of Drag Racing".

Early life

Force was born to Harold and Betty Ruth Force in the Los Angeles suburb of Bell Gardens, California. As a child he lived in logging camps, Indian reservations, migrant farms, and trailer parks.  He survived childhood polio with therapy and perseverance of his mother and family. He played football in high school and attended Cerritos College.
John is one of six children. John has five siblings- Walker, Louie, Tom (now deceased), and Cindy Hem (married to Skip Hem) were all older than John. Dana (Baby Force) Marino is ten years younger than John. Walker and Cindy still live near John in Southern California. Walker Force and Louie Force have worked with John over the years, but Walker Force is the only sibling now working at JFR. Younger sister Dana (Marino) did not grow up in the same house or spend any time with the family in the early years of the Force Family Racing activities. Dana now attends some of the NHRA events as she is a part-time Intern-Journalist with "The Motorsports Report" based in Las Vegas, Nevada, and resides an hour south in Kingman, AZ. She is a realtor by trade, but is Aunt Dana to Adria, Ashley, Courtney and Brittany. Much of the family still attends NHRA National events to cheer on John, Robert Hight (Adria's husband), Brittany and Austin Prock (JFR Crew Chief Jimmy Prock's son) when the events are closer to their homes in Pomona, Las Vegas, Sonoma, and Phoenix.

1978–2004

In 1971, Force drove the Jack Chrisman-built Night Stalker Mustang, his first funny car.  Early in his career, he drove a Corvette, a Monza and then in the 1980s switched to an Oldsmobile Cutlass through the end of the 1993 season. He drove a Chevrolet for 1994, quickly changing to a Pontiac in 1995 and 1996. Force was a Ford driver and team owner from 1997 until 2014, when he returned to Chevrolet.

1985-Travel back in time to an era when John Force was trying to find his place in a drag racing world in Spokane, Wash., at the ADRA World Finals in the latter years of the old American Hot Rod Association. It was part of the syndicated Pro Drag Superstars series. Both Johnny West and John Force were tied at 1650 Points. John Force beat Johnny West in the finals with a time of 5.87 seconds at 252.10 miles per hour 1/4 mile run in the Coca-Cola Wendy's Funny Car. https://www.youtube.com/watch?v=SW-6Jk_gTgk

Between 1987 and 1996, Force won sixty-seven of 203 NHRA national events, four of nine Big Bud Shootouts, and six World Championships. In 1996, with Austin Coil tuning, Force went to the final round in sixteen of nineteen national events, taking thirteen wins, one of the best records ever in Funny Car history. His domination would continue, with ten NHRA FC World Championship wins from 1993 to 2002, including six straight 1997-2002; his success was so amazing, he was accused of cheating (and was willing to strip off his firesuit to prove he was not). Between 1997 and 2006, Force went to the final in 105 of 228 events and took sixty-one tour wins.  On top of that, he had ten of the quickest or fastest passes in Funny Car.

In 1992, the honor of putting Force on the trailer would go to Cruz Pedregon, driving the Larry Minor McDonald's-sponsored Olds to the championship.

Force's points finishes were 23rd, 8th, 26th, 16th, 20th, 4th, 13th, and 5th from 1978-1985. Force then had Castrol Motor Oil jump on as his main sponsor, and was even more successful. From 1986-1995, he finished 4th, 4th, 6th, 1st, 1st, 2nd, 1st, 1st, and 1st. He then had fellow driver and arch-rival Cruz Pedregon's younger brother, Tony, come aboard to drive John's 2nd car. From 1996-2000, John finished 1st all 5 years. In 2001, John had longtime friend and fellow drag racer Gary Densham drive a third car. In that same year, John once again finished as the champion, which he followed up with an astronomical 10th straight world title in 2002. In 2003, for the 1st time since 1992, John didn't win the title. It was not all lost however, because teammate Tony Pedregon won his 1st world title. At the end of the season, Tony Pedregon went on to join brother Cruz in their own racing organization, and Gary Densham went on to race independently. John found quick and personal talent in two young-guns. Eric Medlen, son of long-time JFR crewmember John Medlen, came on to race. John's other driver, Robert Hight, was his son-in-law and crewmember. Both had a lot of success in their season, but John topped both in 2004 with a 13th world title.

In 2000, Force was sponsored by BP's Castrol brand, continuing the relationship between Force and Castrol that began in 1985 and lasted through 2014. After winning his fourth Funny Car title in 1994, Force earned the nickname of "Brute Force" from drivers, and even announcers such as Steve Evans.  This nickname hearkens back to his early days on the track, when he drove his own unsponsored car, named "Brute Force".  Force had a cameo in a 2004 episode of King of the Hill ("Dale Be Not Proud"), in which Dale Gribble donates a kidney to Force, after which it appears he does not need it.

2005

In 2005, Force won 5 events, but only finished third in the championship standings, 32 points behind champion Gary Scelzi, and 24 points behind Ron Capps, both of Don Schumacher Racing [DSR].

2006

In 2006,  Force won his 14th NHRA World Funny Car Championship, defeating Capps in the quarter-finals of the Automobile Club of Southern California NHRA Finals which mathematically eliminated Capps and teammate Robert Hight from the championship. Force went on to win the event, his third of the season and 122nd of his career.

2007

After the death of Eric Medlen, and John Force's crash in Ennis, Texas at the 2007 O'Reilly NHRA Fall Nationals,  Force started 2007 poorly, suffering a DNQ ending a 20+ year consecutive qualifying streak.  He rebounded, winning the O'Reilly NHRA Thunder Valley Nationals in Bristol, Tennessee, then proceeded on to three more final rounds, winning another race in Sonoma, California, putting him fourth in points and allowing him to make the first cut in NHRA's new point system, the Countdown to the Championship aka the "Countdown to Eight". He stumbled again in the next two races but, again, rebounded until his crash.

On September 23, 2007, Force was injured in a crash at the O'Reilly Auto Parts Fall Nationals in Ennis, Texas as he crossed the finish line against Kenny Bernstein. Bernstein's Funny Car drifted into Force's lane, clipping the final timing cone and a foam block which shot into Force's lane. Initially, it was thought that the block ruptured Force's left rear tire, causing it to come apart, violently shaking the chassis until it broke apart. However, it was determined by NHRA after a thorough review, that the block went behind Force's tire and was not the cause of the wreck. Injuries sustained were a broken ankle, abrasion of his right knee, a dislocated left wrist, and badly mangled fingers and toes, and Force had to be airlifted to Baylor University Medical Center in Dallas. Phil Burkart Jr. was added as Force's replacement for the remainder of the 2007 season, starting at Las Vegas.

2008

2008 was a subpar season for Force who finished 7th, out of the top five for the first time since early in his career. However, after the death of driver Scott Kalitta, he was instrumental in the development of some of the safety precautions that were implemented throughout the rest of the season, and along with retired six-time world champion Kenny Bernstein [4 Funny Car titles, 2 Top Fuel titles] and seven-time Top Fuel champion Tony Schumacher, with backing from NHRA's Track Safety Committee, assisted in developing a sensor that monitors the engines of Top Fuel dragsters and Funny Cars. Should the engine backfire at any time during a race, the fuel pump is automatically shut down, and the parachutes are deployed. The idea was to either minimize or eliminate the circumstances that led to Kalitta's death. This safety device became mandatory and was put into place at the start of the 2009 season. Also, a brake handle that, instead of needing to be pulled back toward the driver, was set up to be pushed away from the driver was made an optional setting for the Funny Car division. This change happened because when the 2008 season began, Force's right arm was still in a cast, due to broken fingers, and he needed a different way of using the brakes on the car, rather than the traditional handbrake that needed to be brought back toward the driver; also, in the 2007 accident in Texas, Force had lost some grip in his right hand, and had some problems putting enough pressure on the handbrake to unlock it from position to apply the brakes. This led to the development of the forward application handbrake, which has given several drivers in the Funny Car class quicker access to the brakes. Though Force only finished seventh in the points in 2008, he became influential within the NHRA for innovations in driver safety.

2009

2009 once again saw Force finish outside of the top five. John finished 9th, daughter Ashley finished 2nd, and Mike Neff placing 10th. However, he would win his 16th overall championship as a car owner, with teammate Robert Hight's championship, placing Force as the winningest car owner in NHRA history.

2010

The start of the 2010 season saw Force celebrate 25 years with the same sponsor, as well as 34 years in the NHRA. On February 14, Force won the season opener at Auto Club Raceway at Pomona in the 50th Winternationals in California defeating Ron Capps. After 13 events, Force had 4 wins, and lead the Funny Car points standings with 933, 58 ahead of teammate Robert Hight.

Going into the Auto Club of Southern California Finals in Pomona, CA on November 14, 2010, Force needed some help to win the championship. He started the day 38 points behind 28-year-old Matt Hagan, who ran for team rival Don Shumacher and his team. In order to capture the championship he needed to finish two rounds ahead of Hagan. With Bob Tasca III taking Hagan out in the first round, Force won his first round over Gary Densham and second-round win over Bob Bode, securing the championship. He then went on to victory beating Melanie Troxel in the semi-finals and in the final, defeated Jeff Arend. John Force now has the distinction of being the oldest NHRA champion in history. Long-time crew chief Austin Coil resigned from John Force Racing on November 16, 2010.

2011

As of February 7, 2011, JFR has already flip-flopped cars between John, Robert, Ashley, and Mike. Ashley Force Hood announced that she was expecting her 1st child, and would sit out the 2011 Full Throttle Drag Racing Season. John Force would drive Force Hood's new Ford Mustang with Dean Antonelli and Ron Douglas tuning, sponsored by Castrol Motor Oil. Robert Hight will remain in the Auto Club of Southern California Ford Mustang. Mike Neff, after co-crew chiefing John Force's car with Austin Coil, will drive Force's car from John's 2010 championship season. Neff's Ford Mustang will be sponsored by Castrol Oil. As of February 7, 2011, JFR started testing for the 2011 season. Out of the 11 testers so far, Force is 1st, Hight was 5th, and Neff was 6th.
As of July 31, Force is 7th in the points standings, while teammate Mike Neff is leading, and Robert Hight is in second.

2012

2012 saw John welcome a fourth driver to his stable, former Top Alcohol Dragster champion, and daughter Courtney, who was in the running for the Auto Club Rookie of the Year Award, she will be driving the Traxxas Ford Mustang in her rookie season, and she has done something that only sister Ashley has done, beat her father in the first meeting between the two, taking John out of the Arizona Nationals in Phoenix in just the first round. Although Force was unable to retain the championship, finishing in fifth, he saw Courtney win something he never did, the NHRA Road to the Future Rookie of the Year award, and Courtney's second-place finish in the season helped cement John Force Racing's legacy for several years to come.

2013

During the start of the 2013 season, Ashley announced her retirement from full-time competition, this left the Force team short a driver. Rather than find another driver to take Ashley's place within the Castrol GTX Funny Car, John did something he had never done before, field a Top Fuel car, with daughter Brittany behind the wheel. On July 26, 2013 it was announced that after the 2014 racing season Ford Motor Company would no longer be a part of John Force Racing. It was also announced that after the 2014 racing season, primary sponsor Castrol would be leaving JFR after a 29-year business relationship

During the penultimate race of the 2013 season, Force beat his daughter Courtney in the final round to win the race and his 16th NHRA Funny Car Championship.

2014

He won at the season opener in Pomona California as well wins in Norwalk Ohio & Seattle Washington as he would finish 2nd points.

2015

In 2015 John announced a partnership with Chevrolet. He competed in the 2015 racing season with a new sponsorship deal from Peak Antifreeze.

2016

2017
John's daughter Brittany & Robert Hight both won the championship in Top Fuel & Funny Car respectively. Advance Auto Parts joined team, sponsoring Courtney Force and rest of JFR teams.

2018

Won at the Denver event for his only win of the season.

2019
On August 4, 2019, John Force won his 150th race at the Magic Dry Organic Absorbent NHRA Northwest Nationals in Seattle, Washington, edging out Ron Capps and breaking a 25 race winless streak, having last won in Colorado the year prior, also against Capps. John expressed extreme relief after winning, his first words to the camera being obscenities (which NHRA had to censor, as the broadcast was on network television). Force was not present in the winners' circle, having ridden his pitbike to the stands to watch Austin Prock, a driver on his Top Fuel team and son of a Force Racing mechanic, win his first race and was still celebrating with fans while Prock was being interviewed.

Force further celebrated the 2019 season by winning the U. S. Nationals.

Daughter Courtney Force retired from driving.

2020
He was the runner-up at the season opener in Pomona California but after 2 events he & his teams didn't run again in the 2020 season due to the COVID-19 pandemic but would in the following year.

2021
In his return after missing most of the previous year because of the COVID-19 pandemic he won 3 events. He won at the Charlotte 4 Wide, Epping, & Topeka events. At Dallas for the first time since 2018 John Force was set on fire in a crash that echoed his win in 1996 where his Castrol car caught fire at this track.

2022
He gained a win of the season at the 4-Wide Nationals in Charlotte, NC.

Achievements and awards

Championships
1984 AHRA Funny Car Champion
1985 ADRA Funny Car WORLD FINALS Champion
1990 NHRA Funny Car Champion
1991 NHRA Funny Car Champion
1993 NHRA Funny Car Champion
1994 NHRA Funny Car Champion
1995 NHRA Funny Car Champion
1996 NHRA Funny Car Champion
1997 NHRA Funny Car Champion
1998 NHRA Funny Car Champion
1999 NHRA Funny Car Champion
2000 NHRA Funny Car Champion
2001 NHRA Funny Car Champion
2002 NHRA Funny Car Champion
2003 NHRA Champion Owner (Tony Pedregon, Funny Car)
2004 NHRA Funny Car Champion
2006 NHRA Funny Car Champion
2009 NHRA Champion Owner (Robert Hight, Funny Car)
2010 NHRA Funny Car Champion
2013 NHRA Funny Car Champion 
2017 NHRA Champion Owner (Brittany Force, Top Fuel)
2017 NHRA Champion Owner (Robert Hight, Funny Car)
2019 NHRA Champion Owner (Robert Hight, Funny Car)
2022 NHRA Champion Owner (Brittany Force, Top Fuel)

Achievements

 Selected as "Driver of the Year" for all of American motor racing in 1996 by a national panel of motorsports journalists, the first drag racer ever so honored.
 153 wins in 259 final rounds as of June 13, 2021 (first driver with 100 wins)
 First NHRA drag racer to achieve 1,000 career elimination round wins (1,000th win: first round, 2008 NHRA Midwest Nationals at World Wide Technology Raceway at Gateway near St. Louis, Missouri), where he defeated Ron Capps for the 1,000th round win.
 First driver to set an official NHRA Funny Car elapsed time under five seconds in the quarter mile (October 16, 1993, Texas Motorplex, 4.996).
 16-time NHRA champion driver, and 21-time champion owner.
 Ranked #2 on the NHRA Top 50 Drivers, 1951–2000, behind Don Garlits
 With daughter Ashley, first father/daughter pair to compete against each other, during the first round of the NHRA Southern Nationals in Atlanta in 2008, which saw Ashley win.
 Only driver to have won more than ten championships in his division, beating the record once held by retired NHRA Pro Stock Champion Bob Glidden, who had 10 championships
 Most event #1 qualifications in NHRA history, with 161 (as of May 15, 2021)
 Force received the Lee Iacocca Award at Bristol Dragway on June 19, 2012
 Most consecutive championship seasons - 10 (1993-2002)

Awards

He was inducted into the Motorsports Hall of Fame of America in 2008.

Crypto Currency 
On October 7, 2022 the NHRA Coin John Force Edition NFT  became available on the OpenSea. NFT Marketplace

Driving Force

John was featured on A&E's reality show Driving Force with his wife (Laurie) and three of his daughters (Ashley, Courtney, and Brittany).

See also

 Ford Racing

References

Sources
Taylor, Thom.  "Beauty Beyond the Twilight Zone" in Hot Rod, April 2017, pp. 30–43.

External links

 
 NHRA COIN
 Interview with John Force
 The Truth about Force's crash and heat-treated funny car chassis
 Thinking Back To An Eye-Opening Day With John Force
 Pro file on  NHRA.com
 Driving Force website
 Driving Force profile
 
 Even at 65, he’s still NHRA drag racing’s driving Force - NBC Sports, Jerry Bonkowski, October 3, 2014

1949 births
Dragster drivers
Force family
Living people
Racing drivers from California
Sportspeople from Los Angeles County, California
People from Bell Gardens, California